Makers of Melody is a short film subject from 1929 that showcased the hit song Manhattan.  Manhattan was Rodgers and Hart'''s first hit song.  The song was sung by Ruth Tester'' and Allan Gould.

External links
 
Ruth Tester singing the Rodgers and Hart song, "Manhattan" in the short "Makers of Melody" with Allan Gould https://www.youtube.com/watch?v=NPIgQdOoEV0
Manhattan "I'll Take Manhattan" 78 rpm and cylinder recording https://archive.org/details/RodgersHartInezCourteney-ManhattanMakersOfMelody1929

1929 films
1929 short films
Paramount Pictures short films
American black-and-white films
1929 musical films
American musical films
1920s American films